The Battle of the Vedrosha River was a battle in the course of the Russo-Lithuanian war of 1500–1503 which ended with a decisive Russian victory and proved to be of strategic significance. It was carried out on 14 July 1500, some 50 km to the west of Kaluga, between forces of the Grand Duchy of Lithuania, under command of Prince Konstantin Ostrozhsky and Russian (Muscovite) army under Prince Daniil Shchenya.

The skilled Russian commander employed similar tactics that proved successful for the Russian army in the Battle of Kulikovo. Vedrosha was a crushing victory for the Russians. Some 8,000 Lithuanians were killed, and many more were taken prisoner, including Prince Konstantin Ostrogski, the first ever Grand Hetman of Lithuania.

After the battle the Lithuanians lost the possibility for military initiative and restricted themselves to defensive actions.

Comments by contemporaries 
The battle was described by Sigismund von Herberstein in his Rerum Moscoviticarum Commentarii (1549). Herberstein acidly commented that "in one battle and in one year the Grand Duke of Moscow achieved what Grand Duke Vytautas had spent all his life in achieving".

References

External links
 Data on strength and losses (Russian)

1500 in Lithuania
Vedrosha
Vedrosha
Vedrosha
Vedrosha
1500s in Poland
Military history of Russia